Autographa mandarina is a moth of the family Noctuidae. It is found in Fennoscandia, the Baltic region, Poland, the northern part of European Russia, Belarus and Siberia.

The wingspan is 34–38 mm. Adults are on wing from August to September.

The larvae feed on Cirsium, Taraxacum, Lamium, Plantago and Urtica species.

External links
Swedish Moths and Butterflies
lepidoptera.pl

Plusiini
Moths of Europe
Moths of Asia
Moths described in 1845